The President of the Parliament of Montenegro is the presiding officer of the Parliament of Montenegro. The president's term lasts four years, and is elected by members of each new assembly.

The President of the Parliament serves as the acting President of Montenegro if the elected president vacates the office before the expiration of its five-year term due to death, resignation or removal.

List of presidents

Monarchy

Republic

Interim chairpersons
Since 2002, in case of need the eldest deputy opens and leads the first session when a new Montenegrin parliament is formed, until a speaker is elected (E.g. 2020). The same procedure is in the case of the sudden cessation of the term of the previously elected president, the oldest MP chair parliamentary sessions, until the election of a new speaker. (E.g. in 2003 and 2016)

References

Speaker
Speaker
Speakers of the Parliament of Montenegro